= US residency =

US residency may refer to:

- Residency (medicine) in the United States
- Permanent residence (United States)
